The Princeton Tigers represented Princeton University in ECAC women's ice hockey during the 2015–16 NCAA Division I women's ice hockey season. The Tigers were stopped by nationally ranked Quinnipiac in the ECAC quarterfinals.

Offseason

June 26: Senior Goaltender Kimberly Newell was drafted by the New York Riveters of the NWHL.

Recruiting

2015–16 Tigers

Schedule

|-
!colspan=12 style="  style="background:black;color:#F77F00;"| Regular Season

|-
!colspan=12 style="  style="background:black;color:#F77F00;"| ECAC Tournament

|-
!colspan=12 style="  style="background:black;color:#F77F00;"| NCAA Tournament

Awards and honors
Jeff Kampersall, ECAC Coach of the Year

Kelsey Koelzer, ECAC Defenseman of the Year

Karlie Lund, ECAC Rookie of the Year

Kelsey Koelzer, Defense, All-ECAC First Team

Karlie Lund, Forward, All-ECAC First Team

Karlie Lund, Forward, All-ECAC Rookie Team

References

Princeton
Princeton Tigers women's ice hockey seasons
Princeton Tigers
Princeton Tigers